Boskuil is a small village in North West Province of South Africa.

References

Populated places in the Maquassi Hills Local Municipality